Kaleidoscope: Remixed is a remix album by Dutch electronic dance music artist Tiësto, released on 31 August 2010 in the United States. It is the remix album of Tiësto's fourth studio album, Kaleidoscope, released in 2009.

Track listing

Charts

Release history

References

Electronic remix albums
2010 remix albums
Trance remix albums
Tiësto albums